The St. Julian's Choral Group was formed in March 2003. The choir is predominantly made up of previous St. Julian's Choir members. It is based in St. Julian's, Malta.

Ronnie Galea (who was a member of St. Julians Choir since 1974) set up St. Julian's Choral Group after the St. Julian's Choir was dissolved sometime before.

In 2006 the direction of the choir passed into the hands of local baritone Pio Dalli after the previous director of the choir, Mro. Joseph Gatt, went to fulfil commitments abroad. Choir organists who had contributed to the choir's success in the past included Patrick Falzon Grech and Edward Grech. Currently, the duty of choir organist is entrusted to Marie Claire Gatt.

Over the past years the choir has performed in numerous liturgical services and concerts in various churches and locations in Malta, with the highlight in October 2012, when the group was invited to participate in an annual concert of choirs organised by the ‘Coro La Sissila’ from Montecchio Maggiore in the Province of Vicenza, Italy.

References 

Maltese choirs